Pothugal (Village ID 574711) is a village and panchayat in Ranga Reddy district,
Telangana, India. It falls under Shabad mandal. According to the 2011 census it has a population of 1253 living in 277 households. Its main agriculture product is cotton growing.

References

http://wikimapia.org/15178458/ZPHS-Pothugal-Mandal-Shabad-Rangareddy

Villages in Ranga Reddy district